Steve Paul August (born September 4, 1954) is a former American football offensive tackle in the National Football League (NFL). He played most of his professional football career with the Seattle Seahawks. Through his eight years with the Seahawks he had started more games (90) at right tackle than any other Seahawk at that position, as of the end of the 2018 season.

He was traded to his hometown team the Pittsburgh Steelers midway through the 1984 season.  He started the 1985 preseason with the Steelers and then was acquired off waivers during preseason by the New York Jets. He was on injured reserve for the first half of the 1985 season with the Jets. He retired at midseason of 1985. He played college football at the University of Tulsa.

Notes

1954 births
Living people
American football offensive linemen
Tulsa Golden Hurricane football players
Seattle Seahawks players
Pittsburgh Steelers players
People from Jeannette, Pennsylvania
Players of American football from Pennsylvania